Qalandar may refer to:

 Qalandariyya, a Sufi mystic order
 Qalandar (title), a title for Sufi saints
 Qalandar (clan), a Muslim community found in North India and Pakistan
 Qalandar (tribe), a Hazara tribe found in Afghanistan

Places in Iran
 Qalandar, Ahar, a village in East Azerbaijan Province, Iran
 Qalandar Kashteh, a village in Fars Province, Iran
 Qalandar-e Olya, a village in Ilam Province, Iran
 Qalandar-e Sofla, a village in Ilam Province, Iran
 Qalandar-e Laki, a village in Kermanshah Province, Iran
 Qalandar, Kurdistan, a village in Kurdistan Province, Iran
 Qalandar, Delfan, a village in Lorestan Province, Iran
 Qalandar, Kuhdasht, a village in Lorestan Province, Iran

Saints
 Bu Ali Shah Qalandar, an Indian Sufi mystic and saint
 Lal Shahbaz Qalandar, a Sufi saint born in Iran and buried in Sindh
 Shams Ali Qalandar, a Sufi saint from Punjab, Pakistan, 1874-1966

Cricket 
 Durban Qalandars, a professional cricket team
 Lahore Qalandars, a professional cricket team